Ernst Friedrich Ludwig Robert (or Robert-Tornow; 16 December 1778 – 5 July 1832) was a German dramatist.

Life 
Ludwig Robert was born in Berlin as Liepmann Levin, into a well-off Jewish family, a brother of Rahel Varnhagen von Ense. He wrote plays, including the tragedy Die Macht der Verhältnisse (1819) which deals with the position of Jews in society:

He died, aged 53, in Baden-Baden.

Notes 

18th-century German writers
19th-century German writers
Jewish German writers
Levites
1778 births
1832 deaths
Französisches Gymnasium Berlin alumni
19th-century German male writers
18th-century German male writers